Axinaea pauciflora is a species of plant in the family Melastomataceae. It is endemic to Ecuador.  Its natural habitat is subtropical or tropical moist montane forests. The specific epithet pauciflora is Latin for 'few-flowered'.

References

Flora of Ecuador
pauciflora
Vulnerable plants
Taxonomy articles created by Polbot
Taxa named by Alfred Cogniaux